The Papahānaumokuākea Marine National Monument (PMNM) (roughly ) is a World Heritage listed U.S. National Monument encompassing  of ocean waters, including ten islands and atolls of the Northwestern Hawaiian Islands. It is internationally known for its cultural and natural values as follows:

The area has deep cosmological and traditional significance for living Native Hawaiian culture, as an ancestral environment, as an embodiment of the Hawaiian concept of kinship between people and the natural world, and as the place where it is believed that life originates and to where the spirits return after death. On two of the islands, Nihoa and Mokumanamana, there are archaeological remains relating to pre-European settlement and use. Much of the monument is made up of pelagic and deepwater habitats, with notable features such as seamounts and submerged banks, extensive coral reefs and lagoons.

Description
The monument supports 7,000 species, one quarter of which are endemic. Prominent species include the endangered hawksbill sea turtle, the threatened green sea turtle and the endangered Hawaiian monk seal, the Laysan and Nihoa finches, the Nihoa millerbird, Laysan duck, seabirds such as the Laysan albatross, numerous species of plants including Pritchardia palms, and many species of arthropods. According to the Pew Charitable Trusts, populations of lobster have not recovered from extensive harvesting in the 1980s and 1990s, which is now banned; the remaining fisheries are overfished, although commercial fishing is banned.

The National Marine Fisheries Service (NMFS) reported in 2008 that many species populations have not fully recovered from a large-scale shift in the oceanic ecosystem that affected the North Pacific during the late 1980s and early 1990s. This shift reduced populations of important species such as spiny lobster, seabirds and Hawaiian monk seals. The monument receives strict conservation protection, with exceptions for traditional Native Hawaiian uses and limited tourism.

It contains approximately 10 percent of the tropical shallow water coral reef habitat (i.e., down to ) in U.S. territory. It is slightly larger than Australia's Great Barrier Reef Marine Park, approximately the size of the country of Germany, and just slightly smaller than Alaska.

The islands included in the monument are all part of the State of Hawaii, except Midway Atoll, which is part of the United States Minor Outlying Islands insular area. Henderson Field, on Midway Atoll, provides aerial access to the monument.

About  of the monument are part of the Northwestern Hawaiian Islands Coral Reef Ecosystem Reserve, designated in 2000. The monument also includes the Midway Atoll National Wildlife Refuge and Battle of Midway National Memorial, the Hawaii State Seabird Sanctuary at Kure Atoll, and the Northwestern Hawaiian Islands State Marine Refuge.

As a mixed site with natural and cultural resources, the International Union for Conservation of Nature (IUCN) commented on the natural features of the monument, and the International Council on Monuments and Sites (ICOMOS) assessed its cultural aspects.

Administration 

The monument's ocean area is administered by the National Oceanic and Atmospheric Administration (NOAA).  It contains U.S. and Hawaiian designated refuges, sanctuaries, reserves and memorials with separate administration.

History 

The Northwestern Hawaiian Islands (NWHI) were first protected on February 3, 1909, when U.S. President Theodore Roosevelt created the Hawaiian Islands Bird Reservation through , as a response to the over-harvesting of seabirds, and in recognition of the importance of the NWHI as seabird nesting sites. President Franklin D. Roosevelt converted it into the Hawaiian Islands National Wildlife Refuge in 1940. A series of incremental protection expansions followed, leading to the establishment of Midway Atoll National Wildlife Refuge in 1988, Kure Atoll State Wildlife Sanctuary in 1993, and the NWHI Coral Reef Ecosystem Reserve in 2000.

President Bill Clinton established the Northwestern Hawaiian Islands Coral Reef Ecosystem Reserve on December 4, 2000, with Executive Order 13178. Clinton's executive order initiated a process to designate the waters of the NWHI as a National Marine Sanctuary. A public comment period began in 2002. In 2005, Governor of Hawaii Linda Lingle declared parts of the monument a state marine refuge.

In April 2006, President George W. Bush and his wife viewed a screening of the documentary film Voyage to Kure at the White House along with its director, Jean-Michel Cousteau. Compelled by the film's portrayal of the flora and fauna, Bush moved quickly to expand protections.

 On June 15, 2006, Bush signed Proclamation 8031, designating the waters of the Northwestern Hawaiian Islands a national monument under the 1906 Antiquities Act. Using the Antiquities Act bypassed the normal year of consultations and halted the public input process and came just before the draft environmental impact statement for the proposed Northwestern Hawaiian Islands National Marine Sanctuary was to be published. This was the second use by Bush of the Antiquities Act, following the declaration of the African Burial Ground National Monument on Manhattan in February 2006. The legislated process for stakeholder involvement in the planning and management of a marine protected area (MPA) had already taken five years of effort, but the abrupt establishment of the NWHI as a National Monument, rather than a Sanctuary, provided immediate and more resilient protection. The protection is revocable only by legislation.

Joshua Reichert proclaimed the importance of the timely designation, saying:

The NWHI once accounted for approximately half of the locally landed bottomfish in Hawaii. Frank McCoy, then chair of the Western Pacific Regional Fishery Management Council, claimed:
We are pleased the President recognizes the near pristine condition of the Northwestern Hawaiian Islands waters. We believe the abundance and biodiversity of the area attests to the successful management of the NWHI fisheries by the Council the past 30 years and indicates that properly regulated fisheries can operate in the NWHI without impacting the ecosystem. The small NWHI bottomfish fishery has not and would not jeopardize the protection of the NWHI that President Bush is pursuing by designating the area a national monument.

The National Marine Fisheries Service published reports attesting to the health of bottomfish stocks. Commercial and recreational bottomfish and pelagic fishing were recommended to be continued under a 2004 NOAA draft of protections.

On February 27, 2007, President Bush amended Proclamation 8031, naming the monument "Papahānaumokuākea", inspired by the names of the Hawaiian creator goddess Papahānaumoku and her husband Wākea. 

On May 15, 2007, President Bush announced his intention to submit the monument for Particularly Sensitive Sea Area (PSSA) status, which would "alert mariners to exercise caution in the ecologically important, sensitive, and hazardous area they are entering." In October 2007, the Marine Environmental Protection Committee of the International Maritime Organization designated the monument as a PSSA. Commercial fishing ended in 2010.

The Federal Interagency Panel for World Heritage officially designated the monument as a World Heritage site  in November 2008. The national monument was inscribed on the World Heritage List in July 2010 as "Papahānaumokuākea". at the 34th Session of the World Heritage Committee in Brasília.

A 2010 expedition to the Kure atoll sent divers to a depth of  revealing new species of coral and other animals. Waikiki Aquarium cultured the new coral species.

On August 3, 2015, divers found the wreck of the USNS Mission San Miguel (T-AO-129) within the monument. She had sunk there on October 8, 1957, when she ran aground on Maro Reef while running at full speed and in ballast. Researchers will map and study the wreck in situ.

In August 2016, President Barack Obama expanded the monument's area by roughly four times, to the limits of the exclusive economic zone. It was at that time the world's largest MPA.

On October 21, 2019, the wreck of the Imperial Japanese Navy aircraft carrier , which sank during World War II in the Battle of Midway on June 4, 1942, was found within the monument by the research vessel .

In 2020 a species of seaweed was discovered that has been killing large patches of coral.

In 2022, a study reported that the MPA acted as a tuna nursery. Near the reserve the yellowfin tuna (Thunnus albacares) catch increased by 54% between 2016 and 2019  and the bigeye tuna (Thunnus obesus) take increased by 12%. The catch increased the most at 115 to 230 miles from the area boundaries.

Gallery

See also
 Galápagos Islands
 Great Barrier Reef
 List of largest protected areas in the world
 List of national monuments of the United States
 Valdes Peninsula

References

Further reading

External links

 
 Papahanaumokuakea.gov: Official Papahānaumokuākea Marine National Monument Discovery Center website – homepage + links.
 Papahānaumokuākea UNESCO Collection on Google Arts and Culture
 Facebook.com: Papahānaumokuākea Marine National Monument 
 USFWS: Flickr: FWS photo gallery – Papahānaumokuākea Marine National Monument images.
 USFWS: Hawaiian Islands National Wildlife Refuge
 USFWS: Midway Atoll National Wildlife Refuge
 NOAA/National Oceanic and Atmospheric Administration: Papahānaumokuākea Marine National Monument
 NOAA: Papahānaumokuākea Marine National Monument Condition Report 
  PMNMIMS.org: Papahānaumokuākea Information Management System homepage – (PMNMIMS = Papahānaumokuākea Marine National Monument Information Management System.)
 Smithsonian Ocean Portal: Papahānaumokuākea MNM
 UNESCO: World Heritage Site profile for Papahānaumokuākea Marine National Monument

National Monuments in Hawaii
Northwestern Hawaiian Islands
Marine reserves of the United States
National Wildlife Refuges in Hawaii
Midway Atoll
Nihoa
Archaeological sites in Hawaii
Natural history of the Northwestern Hawaiian Islands
Protected areas of Hawaii
Protected areas established in 2006
2006 establishments in Hawaii
National monuments in insular areas of the United States
World Heritage Sites in the United States
Articles containing video clips